This is a list of events held and scheduled by Fight Nights Global (also known as "Fight Nights"), a mixed martial arts organization based in the Russia.  Upcoming fights are italicized.

List of events

References 

AMC Fight Nights
Fight Nights Global